The 1995–96 season was the 72nd season in the existence of AEK Athens F.C. and the 37th consecutive season in the top flight of Greek football. They competed in the Alpha Ethniki, the Greek Cup and the UEFA Cup Winners' Cup. The season began on 20 August 1995 and finished on 29 May 1996.

Overview

In the summer of 1995, the new major shareholder and president of the team was Michalis Trochanas. In collaboration with Dušan Bajević, he maintained the already very good existing roster and strengthened it with Batista, who returned from Olympiacos, Maladenis and Pavlopoulos. AEK had a very good player material and this was largely due to the fact that many players who were already in the team were having one of the best seasons of their careers.

Dušan Bajević managed to fit all the stars of this team in the starting eleven and built a team that in their good day seemed capable of "destroying" any domestic opponent. AEK played incredible football scoring 87 goals in 34 matches but finished second, behind Panathinaikos, which was much less spectacular, but proved to be slightly more substantial. During the second round, AEK lost much of their self-concentration as a team, due to the Bajević issue. The journalistic information from reports of Olympiacos, who insisted that he had agreed with Sokratis Kokkalis for his move to Olympiacos on the coming summer. Initially those rumors sounded like a joke on the side of AEK, however, the more the Bosnian-Greek coach did not deny them, the greater became the anxiety and insecurity in the club, in which Bajević was then worshiped as a god and the whole story affected the competitive part. At the same time, a big part of the issue was caused by the eccentric announcements of the idiosyncratic Michalis Trochanas, whose behavior in general was later invoked by Bajević for his eventual departure. The victory of Panathinaikos in April at the Olympic Stadium, also played an important role in the outcome of the championship.

In the UEFA Cup Winners' Cup, the team after defeating Sion in the first round they were eliminated by Borussia Mönchengladbach in the second round.

The fantastic football that AEK played this season was rewarded by winning the Cup. A conquest that left no room for doubt, since the "yellow-blacks" after qualifying as first in their group, they eliminated with relative ease at knock-out stage Iraklis and both their rivals, Olympiacos and Panathinaikos in the quarter-finals and semi-finals, respcetivelly. In the final AEK scored a record of 7 goals against Apollon Athens, winning by 7–1, despite the dismissal of Batista at the 52nd minute.

In the end, AEK lost the championship, but the football they played during the season remained not only in the history of the club, but of Greek football in general. All the players who usually made up the starting line-up stood out. Perhaps a little above, was Vasilios Tsiartas, who emerged as the team's and the league's top scorer with 26 goals. Furthermore, Kostis, Ketsbaia and Batista also scored a double-digit number of goals.

Players

Squad information

NOTE: The players are the ones that have been announced by the AEK Athens' press release. No edits should be made unless a player arrival or exit is announced. Updated 30 June 1996, 23:59 UTC+3.

Transfers

In

Summer

Out

Summer

Winter

Renewals

Overall transfer activity

Expenditure
Summer:  ₯120,000,000

Winter:  ₯0

Total:  ₯0

Income
Summer:  ₯0

Winter:  ₯0

Total:  ₯0

Net Totals
Summer:  ₯120,000,000

Winter:  ₯0

Total:  ₯120,000,000

Pre-season and friendlies

Alpha Ethniki

League table

Results summary

Results by Matchday

Fixtures

Greek Cup

Group 1

Matches

Round of 32

Round of 16

Quarter-finals

Semi-finals

Final

UEFA Cup Winners' Cup

First round

Second round

Statistics

Squad statistics

! colspan="11" style="background:#FFDE00; text-align:center" | Goalkeepers
|-

! colspan="11" style="background:#FFDE00; color:black; text-align:center;"| Defenders
|-

! colspan="11" style="background:#FFDE00; color:black; text-align:center;"| Midfielders
|-

! colspan="11" style="background:#FFDE00; color:black; text-align:center;"| Forwards
|-

! colspan="11" style="background:#FFDE00; color:black; text-align:center;"| Left during Winter Transfer Window
|-

|-
|}

Disciplinary record

|-
! colspan="17" style="background:#FFDE00; text-align:center" | Goalkeepers

|-
! colspan="17" style="background:#FFDE00; color:black; text-align:center;"| Defenders

|-
! colspan="17" style="background:#FFDE00; color:black; text-align:center;"| Midfielders

|-
! colspan="17" style="background:#FFDE00; color:black; text-align:center;"| Forwards

|-
! colspan="17" style="background:#FFDE00; color:black; text-align:center;"| Left during Winter Transfer window

|-
|}

References

External links
AEK Athens F.C. Official Website

1995–96
Greek football clubs 1995–96 season